Acacia provincialis, commonly known as swamp wattle or wirilda or water wattle or perennial wattle, is a tree or shrub belonging to the genus Acacia and the subgenus Phyllodineae native to southern and south eastern Australia.

Description
It has a bushy crown and usually has a single stem but can divide into several stems at ground level which have smooth grey coloured bark. The branchlets are usually pendulous and are angled or flattened and a reddish-brown often covered with a white powdery finish. It blooms throughout the year but most heavily between September and January producing racemose inflorescences with spherical flower-heads containing between 18 and 50 flowered golden to pale yellow coloured flowers.

Distribution
It is endemic to Kangaroo Island, the Fleurieu Peninsula and the Mount Lofty Ranges of South Australia and is also present much of eastern and central of Victoria where it is found in damp areas in and along the margins of swamp and creeks growing in sandy, clay or loamy soils. In Victoria the bulk of the population is found between the Glenelg River in the Grampian Ranges to near Melbourne where it is often a part of open-forest communities in poorly drained soils located well inland from the coast. Specimens have also been collected from Tasmania from King Island and near Launceston.

See also
 List of Acacia species

References

provincialis
Flora of South Australia
Flora of Victoria (Australia)
Plants described in 1927
Taxa named by Aimée Antoinette Camus